Isanpur Mota is a village located  from the capital of Gujarat, Gandhinagar, in India.

Villages in Gandhinagar district